The Perhapanauts is an American comic book series created by writer Todd Dezago and artist Craig Rousseau in 2005.

The first two mini-series, "First Blood" and "Second Chances", were published by Dark Horse Comics, but later in 2008, the Perhapanauts comics were published by Image Comics.

Plot
The Image Comics series began with an annual in February 2008, "Jersey Devil", followed by what may either be numerous then-upcoming mini-series or an ongoing series. The first series is "Triangle" taking the team into the Bermuda Triangle, which started publication in April 2008.

The story follows a team of supernatural investigators (in that they both investigate the supernatural, and are supernatural beings who investigate) working for Bedlam, a top-secret government agency. The main focus of the stories are on Blue Group, one team of Bedlam operatives.

The members of Blue Group are Arisa Hines, the group's leader who has psychic powers; Big, a Sasquatch whose intelligence has been artificially raised; Choopie, a Chupacabra with a somewhat erratic personality; MG, a mysterious being who appears human but has the power to travel to other dimensions; and Molly MacAllistar, a ghost. Other characters in the series include Joann DeFile, a psychic who works as an adviser for Bedlam; Peter Hammerskold, a former Marine with psychic powers who is the leader of Bedlam's Red Group and sees Blue Group as rivals; the Merrow, a water-elemental fairy who works at Red Group; and Karl, a Mothman who is a Bedlam reservist and would like to be a full-time member of Blue Group.

Besides their own title, the Perhapanauts appeared in 2008's Image Monster Pile-Up, a one-shot anthology comic that also featured The Astounding Wolf-Man, Proof, and Firebreather.

Collected editions
The series have been collected into trade paperbacks:
 First Blood (128 pages, Dark Horse, September 2006)
 Second Chances (128 pages, Dark Horse,  June 2007)
 Triangle (Image,  2009)
 Danger Down Under! (Image, 2014)

A Kickstarter campaign was organized in 2015 to allow the creators to publish a new graphic novel. The resulting "Into Hollow Earth", a 64-page hardcover story, was released in January 2016 to backers who pledged within a sufficient crowdfunding tier. It has since been made available for purchase through the store of the official Perhapanauts website.

See also
Proof, an ongoing series about a Bigfoot who hunts other cryptids for a clandestine government group
Creature Commandos, a DC Comics team made up of monsters
Nick Fury's Howling Commandos, a Marvel Comics team made up of monsters

Notes

References

External links

Todd Dezago's "Perhapablog"

2005 comics debuts
Dark Horse Comics titles
Image Comics titles